Dumitru Peteu (born 19 October 1913, date of death unknown) was a Romanian bobsledder. He competed in the four-man event at the 1956 Winter Olympics.

References

1913 births
Year of death missing
Romanian male bobsledders
Olympic bobsledders of Romania
Bobsledders at the 1956 Winter Olympics
Place of birth missing